This is a list of law schools in Serbia.

Public
Belgrade Law School (University of Belgrade)
Kosovska Mitrovica Law School (University of Priština)
Kragujevac Law School (University of Kragujevac)
Niš Law School (University of Niš)
University of Novi Sad Faculty of Law (University of Novi Sad)
School of Law, State University of Novi Pazar

Private
School of Law, Union University of Belgrade
Faculty of Law, Megatrend University

Historical
Subotica Law School (University of Belgrade)

See also
 History of legal education in Serbia

Serbia
Universities and colleges in Serbia
Law schools